Ollis is a surname. Notable people with the surname include:

 Bernard Ollis (born 1951), artist
 Ian Ollis (born 1970), politician 
 John Ollis (1839–1913), politician
 Richard Ollis (born 1961), cricketer
 William Ollis (1871–1940), footballer

See also
 Ollis-class ferry